The name Ike has been used for three tropical cyclones worldwide, one in the Atlantic Ocean and two in the Western Pacific Ocean.

In the Atlantic:

Hurricane Ike (2008) – a powerful Category 4 that made landfall in the Bahamas, Cuba, and Texas, causing $28 billion in damage (2008 USD) and over 170 deaths.

The name Ike was retired after the 2008 Atlantic hurricane season and replaced with Isaias for the 2014 season.

In the Western Pacific:

Severe Tropical Storm Ike (1981) (T8104, 04W, Bining) – A severe tropical storm that impacted Taiwan as a Tropical Storm in June 1981.
Typhoon Ike (1984) (T8411, 13W, Nitang) – significant Category 4 Typhoon that affected Philippines and China, killing almost 1,500 people.

The name Ike was retired after the 1984 Pacific typhoon season and replaced with Ian.

Atlantic hurricane set index articles
Pacific typhoon set index articles